Pseudoligostigma argyractalis is a moth in the family Crambidae described by William Schaus in 1912. It is found from western Guatemala to central Costa Rica.

References

Moths described in 1912
Glaphyriinae